A software requirements specification (SRS) is a description of a software system to be  developed. It is modeled after business requirements specification (CONOPS). The software requirements specification lays out functional and non-functional requirements, and it may include a set of use cases that describe user interactions that the software must provide to the user for perfect interaction.

Software requirements specification establishes the basis for an agreement between customers and contractors or suppliers on how the software product should function (in a market-driven project, these roles may be played by the marketing and development divisions). Software requirements specification is a rigorous assessment of requirements before the more specific system design stages, and its goal is to reduce later redesign. It should also provide a realistic basis for estimating product costs, risks, and schedules. Used appropriately, software  requirements specifications can help prevent software project failure.

The software requirements specification document lists sufficient and necessary requirements for the project development. To derive the requirements, the developer needs to have clear and thorough understanding of the products under development. This is achieved through detailed and continuous communications with the project team and customer throughout the software development process.

The SRS may be one of a contract's deliverable data item descriptions or have other forms of organizationally-mandated content.

Typically a SRS is written by a technical writer, a systems architect, or a software programmer.

Structure
An example organization of an SRS is as follows: 

Purpose
Definitions
Background 
System overview
References 
Overall description
Product perspective
System Interfaces
User interfaces
Hardware interfaces
Software interfaces
Communication Interfaces
Memory constraints
Design constraints
Operations
Site adaptation requirements
Product functions
User characteristics 
Constraints, assumptions and dependencies 
Specific requirements
External interface requirements
Performance requirements
Logical database requirement
Software system attributes
Reliability
Availability
Security
Maintainability
Portability
Functional requirements
Functional partitioning
Functional description
Control description
Environment characteristics
Hardware
Peripherals
Users
Other

Requirements smell
Following the idea of code smells, the notion of requirements smell has been proposed to describe issues in requirements specification where the requirement is not necessarily wrong but could be problematic. 

Examples of requirements smells are subjective language, ambiguous adverbs and adjectives, superlatives and negative statements.

See also
System requirements specification
Concept of operations
Requirements engineering
Software Engineering Body of Knowledge (SWEBOK)
Design specification
Specification (technical standard)
Formal specification
Abstract type

References

External links
 
 
 
 ("This standard replaces IEEE 830-1998, IEEE 1233-1998, IEEE 1362-1998 - http://standards.ieee.org/findstds/standard/29148-2011.html")

 
 
 
 

Software requirements
Software documentation
IEEE standards